Corazón Ranchero is the fourth studio album by Shaila Dúrcal. It was released on June 23, 2009. The album received a Grammy nomination for Best Regional Mexican Album at the 52nd Annual Grammy Awards. It also garnered a Latin Grammy nomination for Best Ranchero Album at the Latin Grammy Awards of 2009.

Track listing
Cenizas
Tatuajes
Tu Infame Engaño
Y Llegaste Tú
Dos Coronas A Mi Madre
Las Llaves De Mi Alma
Tu Cárcel
Verdad Que Duele
Un Dolor
En Mi Viejo San Juan
Tu Cárcel (Versión Pop)
Tatuajes (Versión Pop)

References

2009 albums
Shaila Dúrcal albums
Spanish-language albums
EMI Records albums